Max Media Business is a small local business building located in Hamdije Kreševljakovića street in Drvenija in Sarajevo. The building is currently under construction as of April 2022. Work and preparations for the construction began in December 2020 and construction commenced in May 2021. Upon completion, the building will have a total of five floors, one underground floor, lobby, and three floors above it.

History 
Since 2004, Drvenija was seeking to have a public toilet in its neighborhood. On April 29, 2019, Max Media d.o.o requested for a local business and public toilet to be built in Drvenija. On October 28, 2019, the urban permit for construction was handed to Max Media d.o.o. On October 23, 2020, Max Media d.o.o addressed to the competent service with a request for a building permit. The approval for construction was handed over on December 8, 2020, and became effective on December 28, 2020. Preparations for the construction began on December 30, 2020 with the construction commencing around May 2021.

Due to financial issues, the construction was put on hold in March 2022.

Controversy 
Since 2020, controversy has been surrounding the construction of this building. Accusations have targeted Nedžad Ajnadžić (who was the former mayor of the Centar municipality), who secretly approved the construction of the building on his last day of the mandate. Local independent news outlets have regarded this as a form of illegal and unlawful construction.

Gallery

References 

Buildings and structures in Sarajevo
Public toilets